Jeong Hyuk (born May 21, 1986) is a former South Korean footballer.

Jeong Hyuk enjoyed many years at Jeonbuk Hyundai Motors, Jeong Hyuk has also extended his contract with Incheon United for the 2022 season.

For the 2023, season, he has joined K League 2 side Seoul E-Land FC as a coach.

References

External links
 

1986 births
Living people
Association football midfielders
South Korean footballers
Incheon United FC players
Jeonbuk Hyundai Motors players
Ansan Mugunghwa FC players
K League 1 players
K League 2 players